Celia Quinn is a former camogie player, captain of the All Ireland Camogie Championship winning team in 1947. She previously won All Ireland senior medals in 1945 and 1946.

References

Living people
Antrim camogie players
Year of birth missing (living people)